Érik Izraelewicz (6 February 1954 – 27 November 2012) was a French journalist and author, specialised in economics and finance. From February 2011 he was director and editorial executive of the daily Le Monde, after having held the same position at the financial daily newspapers Les Echos and La Tribune.

Life and career

Early life and education 
Izraelewicz was born in Strasbourg, France, of Polish-Jewish parentage, and spent part of his early life in Haguenau, where his father worked as a physician. He attended the lycée Robert Schumann in Haguenau and lycée Kléber in Strasbourg. In 1976 he finished the École des hautes études commerciales (HEC) in Jouy-en-Josas. After that, he studied at the Centre de formation des journalistes (CFJ) for two years, and at the Sorbonne in Paris. He completed his studies in 1979 with a doctorat in international economics, with a thesis about "La Division internationale socialiste du travail à l′intérieur du bloc CAEM (Conseil d′assistance économique mutuelle)".

Career 
Izraelewicz started his career as a journalist specialising in economics and finance at the weekly L′Usine nouvelle, in 1981 he joined L′Expansion. In 1985 he co-founded the financial daily La Tribune de l′économie, later La Tribune. In April 1986 he started working at the economics desk of Le Monde, where he covered French finances, banks and insurances, and became its head in September 1989. From 1993 till 1994 he was Le Monde's correspondent in New York City, in 1996 he became chief editor. He left Le Monde in January 2000 to become managing editor of the financial daily Les Echos, becoming its director in 2007. He left Les Echos in February 2008, after having opposed the newspaper being sold to the LVMH group headed by Bernard Arnault, and joined La Tribune as director, shortly after the newspaper was bought by businessman Alain Weill, who sold the unprofitable paper in May 2010. In July 2010 Izraelewicz left La Tribune, in January 2011 he applied for the position of director of Le Monde. On 7 February 2011 he was appointed director, on 10 February 2011 his appointment was confirmed by the journalists of the newspaper with 74%.

Izraelewicz collapsed from a heart attack while working in his newspaper office. Efforts to revive him were unsuccessful, and he was pronounced dead at a Paris hospital, aged 58.

Quotes 
"I don't consider myself an economist. I am first and foremost a journalist, an economical journalist. I came to economics through journalism".

In a front-page article of Le Monde, Izraelewicz portrayed the flaws of the Olympic Games in Atlanta in July 1996 as a reflection of the negative aspects of American society, writing: "A megalomaniacal America. An America enslaved by technology. An America ruled by money", and he quoted a member of the International Olympic Committee as saying: "It is our fault. We should not have handed over the Olympic Games to private enterprises because their sole aim is to make money".

Publications

Books 
Deux siècles de révolution industrielle. Un dossier de L′Expansion with Philippe Lefournier, Claude Barjonet, Jacques Fontaine, et al. (Hachette, 1983) 
Paul Claudel, «La crise». Correspondance diplomatique, Amérique 1927–1932. Présentation par Erik Izraëlewicz (Métailié, 1993)  Google books
Ce Monde qui nous attend, les peurs françaises et l'économie (Grasset, 1997)  Google books
Le Capitalisme zinzin (Grasset, 1999)  Google books
Monsieur Ni-Ni, l′économie selon Jospin, with Christine Mital (Robert Laffont, 2002)  Google books
Quand la Chine change le monde (Grasset, 2005) ; (Le Livre de Poche, 2005)  Internet Archive
Ce que la crise a changé. 60 personnalités imaginent le monde de demain (Arnaud Franel, 2009)  Google books
L'Arrogance chinoise (Grasset, 2011)  Google books

Articles 
France's New Capitalists. Foreign Policy, 1 November 2000

Awards 
In 1999, Izraelewicz received the first Prix du livre d'économie for "Le Capitalisme zinzin", in 2005 he received the Prix Aujourd'hui for "Quand la Chine change le monde", and in 2011 "L'arrogance chinoise" was awarded the prix lycéen «Lire l'Économie».

References

External links 
Bio. Speakers Academy
 
Blog d′Erik Izraelewicz . La Tribune (in French).
Erik Izraelewicz souhaite que «Le Monde» s'inspire du modèle du Huffington Post. Libération, 14 February 2011 (in French).
Le nouveau "Monde", version Erik Izraelewicz. Organigramme et projet . Old fashion media, 4 April 2011 (in French).
Erik Izraelewicz cumule direction du Monde et direction de la rédaction. L′Express, 4 April 2011 (in French).
Erik Izraelewicz (Le Monde): le web, "le support qui explose". L′Express, 28 July 2011 (in French).

1954 births
2012 deaths
French economists
French newspaper editors
French people of Polish-Jewish descent
HEC Paris alumni
Writers from Strasbourg
French male non-fiction writers